Julio César Álvarez Montelongo (born April 11, 1983), better known as Julión Álvarez, is a Mexican singer. Álvarez has been nominated for a Grammy Award and two Latin Grammy Awards.

Early life and career 

Julión Álvarez was born and raised in La Concordia, Chiapas, México. In 2003 he joined the Mexican band, "Banda MS", until 2006. Following the leave of "Banda MS" he decided to form a band called "Julión Álvarez y Su Norteno Banda".
In 2011 he married Nathaly Fernandez, ex of El Gallo de Oro Valentin Elizalde.

In 2014, Álvarez was selected by Miguel Angel Fox, producer of the Mexican talent show, La Voz... Mexico to participate as coach in its fourth edition. He later went on to be the winning coach with his pupil, Guido Rochin.

In September 2015, Álvarez's album, El Aferrado was nominated at the 16th Annual Latin Grammy Awards for Best Banda Album. His song, "El Amor De Su Vida" was nominated for Best Regional Song.

In May 2016, it was announced that Álvarez would embark on a 22-Foot Arena Tour in the United States, the first for a regional Mexican act.
/In September 2016, Álvarez' album, Mis Ídolos, Hoy Mis Amigos!!! was nominated for Best Banda Album at the 2016 Latin Grammy Awards.

On August 10, 2017, the United States Department of the Treasury, froze Álvarez's assets in the United States and forbid American persons and companies from doing business with him for allegedly violating the Foreign Narcotics Kingpin Designation Act. As a result, Álvarez's U.S. tour was cancelled. Álvarez has denied the allegation brought by the U.S. Treasury Department and says he is willing to cooperate with authorities.

In November 2017, it was announced that Álvarez's album, Ni Diablo, Ni Santo was nominated for Best Regional Mexican Music Album at the 60th Annual Grammy Awards.

In June 2022, after 5 years working in coordination with the authorities of both countries, it was announced that Álvarez's allegations linked to the Foreign Narcotics Kingpin Designation Act were finally removed and he may continue to perform and engage in businesses on the United States.

Discography 
Corazón mágico (2007)
Desde Mazatlan A Mover el Cu.... (2008)
Cumbia del río (2008)
Corridos (2008)
Corridos Privados (2009)
Con Banda (2009)
Ni Lo Intentes (2010)
El rey del carnaval (2010)
Vive Grupero, El Concierto Julián Álvarez Y Su Norteño Banda [Live Mexico D. F. / 2010]
Márchate y olvídame (2011)
En Vivo Desde Guadalajara (2012)
Tu amigo nada más (2013)
Soy Lo Que Quiero:...Indispensable (2014)
El aferrado (2015)
La Más Completa Collecion (2015)
Mis Ídolos, Hoy Mis Amigos!!! (2016)
Ni Diablo, Ni Santo (2017)
 Este Soy Yo (2019)
Incomparable (2021)
De Hoy En Adelante, Que Te Vaya Bien (2022)

 Awards and nominations 
 Grammy Awards 
The Grammy Awards are awarded annually by the National Academy of Recording Arts and Sciences of the United States. Álvarez has received one nomination.

|-
| 2018
| Ni Diablo, Ni Santo| Best Regional Mexican Music Album
| 
|-
|}

 Latin American Music Awards 
The Latin American Music Awards are awarded annually by the television network Telemundo in the United States. Álvarez has received two awards from five nominations.

|-
| rowspan="3" scope="row"|2015
| rowspan="2" scope="row"|Julión Álvarez y Su Norteña Banda
| Artist of the Year
| 
|-
| Favorite Regional Mexican Band, Duo, or Group
|  
|-
| "Y Fue Así"
| Favorite Regional Mexican Song
| 
|- 
| rowspan="2" scope="row"|2016
| Mis Ídolos, Hoy Mis Amigos!!!'| Favorite Regional Mexican Album
| 
|-
| Julión Álvarez y Su Norteña Banda
| Favorite Regional Mexican Band, Duo, or Group
| 
|-
|}

Latin Grammy Awards
The Latin Grammy Awards are awarded annually by the Latin Academy of Recording Arts & Sciences in the United States. Álvarez has received three nominations.

|-
| rowspan="2" scope="row"| 2015
| El Aferrado| Best Banda Album
| 
|-
| "El Amor De Su Vida"
| Best Regional Mexican Song
| 
|-
| 2016
| Mis Ídolos, Hoy Mis Amigos!!!| Best Banda Album
| 
|-
|}

Lo Nuestro Awards
The Lo Nuestro Awards are awarded annually by the television network Univision in the United States. Álvarez has received three awards from fifteen nominations.

|-
| 2011
| Julión Álvarez (himself)
| Regional Mexican Male Artist of the Year
| 
|-
| rowspan="2" scope="row"|2012
| rowspan="2" scope="row"|Julión Álvarez (himself)
| Banda Artist of the Year
| 
|-
| Regional Mexican Male Artist of the Year
| 
|-
| rowspan="2" scope="row"|2013
| Márchate y Olvídame| Regional Mexican Album of the Year
| 
|-
| Julión Álvarez (himself)
| Regional Mexican Male Artist of the Year
| 
|-
| rowspan="2" scope="row"|2014
| Tu Amigo Nada Más| Regional Mexican Album of the Year
| 
|-
| Julión Álvarez (himself)
| Regional Mexican Male Artist of the Year
| 
|-
| rowspan="2" scope="row"|2015
| Soy Lo Que Quiero... Indispensable''
| Regional Mexican Album of the Year
| 
|- 
| rowspan="2" scope="row"|Julión Álvarez (himself)
| Regional Mexican Male Artist of the Year
| 
|-
| rowspan="3" scope="row"|2016
| Banda Artist of the Year
| 
|-
| "Y Fue Así"
| Regional Mexican Song of the Year
| 
|-
| Julión Álvarez (himself)
| Regional Mexican Male Artist of the Year
| 
|-
| rowspan="3" scope="row"|2017
| rowspan="3" scope="row"|Julión Álvarez (himself)
| Banda Artist of the Year
| 
|-
| Regional Mexican Male Artist of the Year
| 
|- 
| Male Artist of the Year
| 
|}

References 

1983 births
Living people
Banda musicians
Fonovisa Records artists
Singers from Chiapas
21st-century Mexican singers
21st-century Mexican male singers
Latin music record producers